Festival Stakes may refer to:

Festival Stakes (ATC), a Group 3 horse race run at Rosehill Racecourse, Australia
Festival Stakes (Great Britain), a Listed horse race run at Goodwood Racecourse, England